Graminella is a genus of leafhoppers in the family Cicadellidae. There are at least 30 described species in Graminella.

Species
These 30 species belong to the genus Graminella:

 Graminella albovenosus Sanders & DeLong 1923 c g
 Graminella ampla Beamer 1938 c g
 Graminella aureovittata b
 Graminella aureovittatus Sanders & DeLong 1920 c g
 Graminella barinasensis Freytag 1989 c g
 Graminella cognita Caldwell, 1952 c g b
 Graminella comatus Ball 1900 c g
 Graminella fitchii (Van Duzee, 1890) c g b
 Graminella floridana DeLong & Mohr 1937 c g
 Graminella inca Kramer 1965 c g
 Graminella jimi de Menezes 1974 c g
 Graminella kappa Kramer 1965 c g
 Graminella lambda Kramer 1965 c g
 Graminella longifurcata Linnavuori & DeLong 1979 c g
 Graminella medleri Kramer 1965 c g
 Graminella mohri DeLong 1937 c g
 Graminella nielsoni Kramer 1965 c g
 Graminella nigrifrons Forbes, 1885 c g b (black-faced leafhopper)
 Graminella nigripennis DeLong 1923 c g
 Graminella oquaka DeLong, 1937 c g b
 Graminella pallidula (Osborn, 1898) c g b
 Graminella plana b
 Graminella planus DeLong 1924 c g
 Graminella punctata Caldwell 1952 c g
 Graminella puncticeps Linnavuori 1959 c g
 Graminella sonora b (lesser lawn leafhopper)
 Graminella sonorus Ball 1900 c g
 Graminella villica b
 Graminella villicus Crumb 1915 c g
 Graminella virginianus Sanders & DeLong 1922 c g

Data sources: i = ITIS, c = Catalogue of Life, g = GBIF, b = Bugguide.net

References

Further reading

External links

 

Deltocephalinae